Daoxianghu Lu Station is a station on the Line 16 of the Beijing Subway. This station is opened in December 2016.

Station layout 
This station has an underground island platform.

Exits 
There are 3 exits, lettered C, D1, and D2. Exits D1 and D2 are accessible.

Transport connections

Rail
Schedule as of December 2016:

References

External links 

Daoxianghulu Station - Beijing MTR Corporation Limited

Beijing Subway stations in Haidian District
Railway stations in China opened in 2016